The Hangman's Daughter (original title in ) is a novel by Oliver Pötzsch. First published in Germany by Ullstein Verlag in 2008, it was translated into English and issued digitally under the AmazonCrossing imprint in 2010. A paper edition was released in English by Houghton Mifflin Harcourt in 2010.

The book is set beginning in 1659, while its prologue briefly recounts events from 1624.

The characters continue in the sequels The Dark Monk (2009), The Beggar King (2010), The Poisoned Pilgrim (2012), The Werewolf of Bamburg (2015) and The Play of Death (2017) and The Council of Twelve (2018). The most recent novel in the series is The Hangman's Daughter and the Curse of the Plague (2020).

The series had sold over 800,000 copies in all formats by the time the fourth title in the series, The Poisoned Pilgrim, was published in 2012.

The primary setting for each of the books in the series is the Bavarian town of Schongau, which is located along the Lech, between Landsberg am Lech and Füssen. The main entrance to the town is the Hof Gate, inside of which live the respected tradesmen, hence the houses look sturdier and are built exclusively of stone. Those with wealth had been able to move away from the pungent tanners' quarter, on the banks of the Lech, or the butchers' quarter to the east.

Main characters

Jakob Kuisl, the town's hangman. He is married to Anna Maria. The couple are parents to Magdalena (for whom the book is named) and twins Georg and Barbara
Simon Fronwieser, the son of the town's physician Bonifaz Fronwieser
Konrad Weber, the parish priest
Resl, server at the Goldener Stern Inn

Aldermen
Johann Lechner, court clerk
Karl Semer, burgomaster and landlord of the inn
Matthias Holzhofer, burgomaster
Johann Püchner, burgomaster
Wilhelm Hardenberg, superintendent of the Holy Ghost almshouse
Jakob Schreevogl, stovemaker and trial witness. He is married to Maria. They are guardians of Clara
Michael Berchtholdt, baker and trial witness
Georg Augustin, wagon driver and trial witness

References

2008 German novels
German historical novels
Fiction set in the 17th century
Witchcraft in written fiction